The Italian War of 1551–1559, sometimes known as the Habsburg–Valois War and the Last Italian War,  began in 1551 when Henry II of France declared war against Holy Roman Emperor Charles V with the intent of recapturing parts of Italy and ensuring French, rather than Habsburg, domination of European affairs. The war ended following the signing of the Treaty of Cateau-Cambrésis between the monarchs of Spain, England and France in 1559. Historians have emphasized the importance of gunpowder technology, new styles of fortification to resist cannon fire, and the increased professionalization of the soldiers.

Timeline 
This is an overview of notable events including battles during the war.
Prelude (1547–1551)
 10 September 1547: Pier Luigi Farnese, Duke of Parma, was assassinated, after which troops of Emperor Charles V occupied the Duchy of Parma.
 ? 1547: Ottavio Farnese, Pier Luigi's son, attacked but failed to regain Parma from the Imperial garrison commanded by Ferrante Gonzaga.
 7 February 1550: The 1549–1550 papal conclave after Pope Paul III's death elected Pope Julius III, who immediately confirmed Ottavio Farnese's ownership of the Duchy of Parma. This angered Emperor Charles V, whose troops still occupied the duchy.
 June – 8 September 1550: Andrea Doria's Capture of Mahdia (1550) on behalf of Emperor Charles V.
 Late 1550: Henry II of France renewed the Franco-Ottoman alliance in response to the fall of Mahdia.
 27 May 1551: Henry II of France and Ottavio Farnese, Duke of Parma signed a defensive alliance, placing Parma under French protection.

First phase (June 1551 – February 1556)
 June 1551: The War of Parma broke out between Emperor Charles V and Pope Julius III against Henry II of France and Ottavio Farnese. 
 July 1551: Invasion of Gozo (1551). Ottoman victory over the Maltese Knights Hospitaller.
 15 August 1551: Siege of Tripoli (1551). Ottomans captured Tripoli from Maltese Knights Hospitaller.
 July 1551 – March 1552: Siege of Mirandola (1551). Franco–Farnese victory over Imperial-Spanish-Papal army.
 15 January 1552: Treaty of Chambord. Henry II of France allied himself with German Protestant princes against Charles V.
 29 April 1552: A two-year truce ended the War of Parma.
 March–August 1552: Second Schmalkaldic War (or Princes' Revolt). The French-allied German Protestant princes defeated Charles V (Peace of Passau, 2 August), while Henry II annexed the Three Bishoprics to France.
 July 1552: Franco-Ottoman raid on Reggio and Calabria. Franco-Ottoman victory over Spain.
 5 August 1552: Battle of Ponza (1552). Franco-Ottoman victory over Genoa (allied with Charles V).
 July 1552: Anti-Spanish revolt in Siena.
 17 July 1552: Sienese rebels welcomed a French garrison to defend it against Spanish recapture attempts.
 19 October 1552 – 2 January 1553: Siege of Metz (1552). French victory over Imperial army.
 January–February 1553: Spanish viceroy for Naples, Pedro de Toledo y Zúñiga, made a failed attempt to recapture Siena with Florentine assistance.
 11 April – 20 June 1553: Siege of Thérouanne. Spanish-Imperial victory over France. The Imperials razed Thérouanne to the ground on the orders of Charles V in revenge for the defeat at Metz.
 25 November 1553: Cosimo de' Medici, Duke of Florence, signed a secret treaty with Charles V to reconquer Siena for the Emperor.
 1553–1559: Invasion of Corsica (1553). Ottomans & French temporarily occupied most of Corsica.
 2 August 1554: Battle of Marciano or Scannagallo. Decisive Florentine-Spanish victory over Siena and France.
 12 August 1554: Battle of Renty. French victory over Imperial army.
 January 1554 – 21 April 1555: Siege of Siena. Spanish victory over Siena and France. End of the Republic of Siena, which was annexed by the Duchy of Florence in 1559.
 June 1555: Failed peace Conference of Marck within the Pale of Calais.
 October 1555: Peace talks resumed. 

Truce (February–September 1556)
 5 February 1556: Truce of Vaucelles signed between Charles V and Henry II of France.
 Abdication of Charles V: Philip II had succeeded him as king of Spain and Lord of the Netherlands on 16 January 1556 and 25 October 1555, respectively; Ferdinand I had succeeded him as Holy Roman Emperor on 27 August 1556, although it would take some years for the Imperial Diet (3 May 1558) and the Pope (1559) to recognise Ferdinand as such.

Second phase (September 1556 – April 1559)
 1 September 1556: Spanish invasion and occupation of the Papal States.
 September–December 1556: Attempts to limit the renewal of hostilities to the Papal States failed, and preparations for full-scale war were made.
 6 January 1557: Gaspard II de Coligny, the French governor of Picardy, launched surprise attacks on Douai and Lens in the Spanish Netherlands, reopening the northern front. 
 August 1557: Siege of Civitella. Spanish victory over France.
 10–27 August 1557: Battle of St. Quentin (1557). Hispano-Savoyard-English victory over France.
 12 September 1557: Spanish occupation of the Papal States. Pope Paul IV signed a separate peace treaty with the Duke of Alba (Spain).
 1–8 January 1558: Siege of Calais (1558). French victory over England.
 17 April – 23 June 1558: Siege of Thionville (1558). French victory over Imperial-Spanish army.
 July 1558: Raid of the Balearic islands (1558). Ottoman victory over Spain.
 13 July 1558: Battle of Gravelines (1558). Anglo-Spanish victory over France.
 21 September 1558: Charles V died.
 2 and 3 April 1559: Peace treaties of Cateau-Cambrésis.
 10 July 1559: Henry II died of wounds of a jousting accident during the celebration of the Treaty of Cateau-Cambrésis.

Operations

Mediterranean campaigns

Henry II sealed a treaty with Suleiman the Magnificent in order to cooperate against the Habsburgs in the Mediterranean. This was triggered by the conquest of Mahdiya by the Genoese Admiral Andrea Doria on 8 September 1550, for the account of Charles V. The alliance allowed Henry II to push for French conquests towards the Rhine, while a Franco-Ottoman fleet defended southern France.

The 1551 Ottoman Siege of Tripoli was the first step of the all-out Italian War of 1551–59 in the European theater, and in the Mediterranean the French galleys of Marseille were ordered to join the Ottoman fleet. In 1552, when Henry II attacked Charles V, the Ottomans sent 100 galleys to the Western Mediterranean, which were accompanied by three French galleys under Gabriel de Luetz d'Aramon in their raids along the coast of Calabria in Southern Italy, capturing the city of Reggio. In the Battle of Ponza in front of the island of Ponza, the fleet met with 40 galleys of Andrea Doria, and managed to vanquish the Genoese and capture seven galleys. This alliance would also lead to the combined Invasion of Corsica in 1553. The Ottomans continued harassing the Habsburg possessions with various operations in the Mediterranean, such as the Ottoman invasion of the Balearic islands in 1558, following a request by Henry II.

Land campaigns

War of Parma 

On the continental front, the opening phase of the war was marked by the Parmesan succession crisis: the newly elected Pope Julius III had confirmed Ottavio Farnese as the Duke of Parma and Piacenza, while Charles V's Imperial troops had occupied the city in 1547 after Ottavio's father's assassination. Seeing France as his best choice against the Emperor, Ottavio Farnese signed a defensive alliance with Henry II of France on 27 May 1551, placing Parma under French protection. Charles could not accept this, and pressured the Pope into an alliance against France and Parma, causing the War of Parma in June 1551. The main combat of this phase was the Siege of Mirandola (1551), during which the Franco-Farnese defenders repulsed attacks by the Papal-Imperial-Spanish forces. The belligerents agreed to a two-year truce on 29 April 1552, ratified by Charles V on 10 May, which ended the War of Parma.

Schmalkaldic War and Sienese siege 

Meanwhile, Henry II allied with German Protestant princes against Charles V with the Treaty of Chambord on 15 January 1552. An early offensive into Lorraine, in the Second Schmalkaldic War, was successful, with Henry capturing the Three Bishoprics of Metz, Toul, and Verdun and securing them by defeating the invading Habsburg army at the Battle of Renty (12 August 1554). In 1552, an anti-Spanish revolt in the Republic of Siena gave Henry another ally; on 17 July 1552, a Franco-Sienese army managed to expel the Spanish garrison. The Sienese welcomed a French garrison to defend the Republic against Spanish recapture attempts. A French army invaded Tuscany in 1553 in support of the Sienese Republic. In January 1554, the Spanish started besieging the city of Siena. The French troops were attacked by an Imperial‐Florentine army and defeated at the Battle of Marciano by Gian Giacomo Medici (2 August 1554). After an 18-month-long siege, Siena fell to Spanish forces on 15 April 1555. Although a  run by exiled Sienese loyalists continued to exist until 3 April 1559, the territory of the Republic of Siena was fully annexed to the Duchy of Florence under Cosimo I de' Medici with the Treaty of Cateau-Cambrésis (3 April 1559), and eventually became part of the Grand Duchy of Tuscany (1569).

Papal front and St. Quentin 
A treaty in Vaucelles was signed on 5 February 1556 between Charles V and Henry II of France. After Emperor Charles' abdication in 1556 split the Habsburg empire between Philip II of Spain and Ferdinand I, the focus of the war shifted to Flanders. However, the truce was broken shortly afterwards. Pope Paul IV was displeased and urged Henry II to join the Papal States in an invasion of Spanish Naples. On 1 September 1556, Philip II responded by pre-emptively invading the Papal States with 12,000 men under the Duke of Alba. French forces approaching from the north were defeated and forced to withdraw at the Siege of Civitella in August 1557. Philip, in conjunction with Emmanuel Philibert, Duke of Savoy, defeated the French in the Battle of St. Quentin (1557) (10–27 August). The Spanish attempted to blockade Rome by occupying the port of Ostia but were driven back by the Papal armies in a surprise attack. However, when French troops were unable to come to their aid, the Papal armies were left exposed and were defeated, with Spanish troops under the Duke of Alba arriving at the edge of Rome. Out of fear of another sack of Rome, Paul IV agreed to the Duke of Alba's demand for the Papal States to declare neutrality by signing the Peace of Cave-Palestrina (12 September 1557). Emperor Charles V criticized the peace agreement as being overly generous to the Pope.

English entry and Gravelines 
A brief French-backed revolt led by Thomas Stafford against queen Mary I of England resulted in a three-day siege of Scarborough Castle in April 1557. Mary declared war on France in June 1557 and English troops assisted in the victory at St. Quentin in August. But England's entry into the war provoked the French Siege of Calais in January 1558, which was a defeat for the English. French armies plundered Spanish possessions in the Low Countries and emerged victorious in the Siege of Thionville (April–June 1558). Nonetheless, Henry lost gravely at the Battle of Gravelines (13 July 1558) and was forced to accept a peace agreement in which he renounced any further claims to Italy.

The wars ended for other reasons, including "the Double Default of 1557", when the Spanish Empire, followed quickly by the French, defaulted on its debts. In addition, Henry II had to confront a growing Protestant movement at home, which he hoped to crush.

Military technology
Oman (1937) argues that the inconclusive campaigns which generally lack a decisive engagement were largely due to ineffective leadership and lack of offensive spirit. He notes that mercenary troops were used too often and proved unreliable. Hale emphasizes the defensive strength of bastion forts newly designed at angles to dissipate cannon fire. Cavalry, which had traditionally used shock tactics to overawe the infantry, largely abandoned it and relied on pistol attacks by successive ranks of attackers. Hale notes the use of old-fashioned mass formations, which he attributes to lingering conservatism. Overall, Hale emphasizes new levels of tactical proficiency.

Finance 
In 1552 Charles V had borrowed over 4 million ducats, with the Metz campaign alone costing 2.5 million ducats. Shipments of treasure from the Indies totalled over two million ducats between 1552 and 1553. By 1554, the cash deficit for the year was calculated to be over 4.3 million ducats, even after all tax receipts for the six ensuing years had been pledged and the proceeds spent in advance. Credit at this point began costing the crown 43 percent interest (largely financed by the Fugger and Welser banking families). By 1557 the crown was refusing payment from the Indies since even this was required for payment of the war effort (used in the offensive and Spanish victory at the battle of St. Quentin in August 1557).

French finances during the war were mainly financed by the increase in the taille tax, as well as indirect taxes like the gabelle and customs fees. The French monarchy also resorted to heavy borrowings during the war from financiers at rates of 10–16 percent interest. The taille was estimated in collection for 1551 at around six million livres.

During the 1550s, Spain had an estimated military manpower of around 150,000 soldiers, whereas France had an estimated manpower of 50,000.

Treaty of Cateau-Cambrésis (1559)

Summary 

The Treaty of Cateau-Cambrésis (1559) consisted of two treaties: the first one was signed between Elizabeth I of England and Henry II of France on April 2; the second one was signed between Henry II of France and Philip II of Spain on April 3. The two treaties also defined the conclusion of the Imperial-French wars and therefore the end of the Habsburg-Valois conflict as a whole, with the approval of Ferdinand I, Holy Roman Emperor. The four monarchs did not meet in person but were represented by ambassadors and delegations. Some Italian states also attended the conference.

Franco-Spanish agreement

Anglo-French agreement

Aftermath 

Emmanuel Philibert, Duke of Savoy married Margaret of France, Duchess of Berry, the sister of Henry II of France. Philip II of Spain married Elisabeth, the daughter of Henry II of France. During a tournament held to celebrate the peace on 1 July, king Henry was injured in a jousting accident when a sliver from the shattered lance of Gabriel Montgomery, captain of the Scottish Guard at the French Court, pierced his eye and entered his brain. He died ten days later on 10 July 1559. His 15-year-old son Francis II succeeded him before he too died in December 1560 and was replaced by his 10-year-old brother Charles. The resulting political instability, combined with the sudden demobilisation of thousands of largely unpaid troops, led to the outbreak of the French Wars of Religion in 1562 that would consume France for the next thirty years. 

At the end of the conflict, Italy was divided between viceroyalties of the Spanish Habsburgs in the south and the formal fiefs of the Austrian Habsburgs in the north. The imperial states were ruled by the Medici in Tuscany, the Spanish Habsburgs in Milan, the Estensi in Modena, and the House of Savoy in Piedmont. The Kingdoms of Naples, Sicily and Sardinia were under direct rule of the Spanish Habsburgs.

The situation continued until the European wars of succession of the 18th century, when northern Italy passed to the Austrian house of Habsburg-Lorraine, and southern Italy passed to the Spanish Bourbons. The Papacy, in central Italy, maintained major cultural and political influence during the Catholic Reformation that was initiated by the conclusion of the Tridentine Council, which was resumed by the treaty's terms.

See also 
 Elizabeth I of England
 Franco-Ottoman alliance
 States of Italy in 1559

Footnotes

References

Bibliography 
  
 Baumgartner, Frederic J. Henry II, King of France 1547–1559 (Duke Univ Press, 1988).
 Haan, Bertrand, Une paix pour l’éternité. La négociation du traité du Cateau-Cambrésis, (2010). Madrid: Casa de Velázquez.
 Oman, Charles W. C. A History of the Art of War in the Sixteenth Century (1937).
 Pepper, Simon, and Nicholas Adams. Firearms & Fortifications: Military Architecture and Siege Warfare in Sixteenth-century Siena (University of Chicago Press, 1986).
 Romier, Lucien, Les guerres d'Henri II et le traité du Cateau-Cambrésis (1554–1559), in: MAH 30 (1910), p. 1–50.
 Setton, Kenneth M. The Papacy and the Levant (1204–1571) (American Philosophical Society, 1984).

External links 

 The original French-language Treaty of Cateau-Cambrésis between France and Spain

 
1550s conflicts
1550s in Italy
1551 in Italy
1556 in law
1559 in Italy
1559 in law
1550s in the Ottoman Empire
16th-century military history of the Kingdom of England
16th-century military history of France
16th-century military history of Spain
Italian Wars
Wars involving England
Wars involving the Ottoman Empire
Henry II of France
Suleiman the Magnificent
Pope Paul IV
Charles V, Holy Roman Emperor
Ferdinand I, Holy Roman Emperor
William the Silent
Pope Julius III
Philip II of Spain
Mary I of England
Elizabeth I